Cordyline manners-suttoniae, known as the broad-leafed palm lily or swamp palm lily is an evergreen Australian plant. A shrub to 5 metres tall. Found only in Queensland, in swampy places, often in rainforests.

Flowering occurs in spring or summer, with attractive white flowers forming on panicles. Like many of the Australian Cordyline plants, red berries are another appealing ornamental feature. For the garden, it is best suited to a warm and moist situation. Being a tropical plant, it is not suited to frost and cold winds.

References 

manners-suttoniae
Asparagales of Australia
Endemic flora of Queensland
Garden plants
Taxa named by Ferdinand von Mueller
Plants described in 1865